London Buses route 74 is a Transport for London contracted bus route in London, England. Running between Baker Street station and Putney, it is operated by London General.

Proposed withdrawal
In June 2022, TfL launched a consultation on a range of bus cuts which included the proposed merger of route 74 and 430, but it would be shortened to South Kensington to reduce duplication with services 2 and 13. With the merger, the affected portion from West Brompton, via Warwick Road, Creswell Gardens and Onslow Gardens would no longer run. On 23 November 2022, it was announced that these changes would not be going ahead.

Current route

Putney High Street
Putney Bridge tube station 
Charing Cross Hospital
Brompton Library
West Brompton station   
Earl's Court station 
Gloucester Road station 
South Kensington station 
Knightsbridge station 
Hyde Park station 
Marble Arch station 
Baker Street station

References

External links

Timetable

Bus routes in London
Transport in the Royal Borough of Kensington and Chelsea
Transport in the London Borough of Wandsworth